Bongseong-myeon (Hangeul: 봉성면, Hanja: 鳳城面) is a myeon or a township in Bonghwa county of North Gyeongsang province in South Korea. The total area of Bongseong-myeon is 66.69 square kilometers, and, as of 2006, the population was 2,583 people. Bongseong-myeon is further divided into seven "ri", or small villages.

Administrative divisions
Bongseong-ri (봉성리)
Oesam-ri (외삼리)
Changpyeng-ri (창평리)
Dongyang-ri (동양리)
Geumbong-ri (금봉리)
Ugok-ri (우곡리)
Bongyang-ri (봉양리)

Schools
Bongseong Elementary School(봉성초등학교) in Bongseong-ri.
Dongyang Elementary School (동양초등학교) in Dongyang-ri.

Sources

External links
  Bongseong-myeon Office Homepage
 Tourist Map of Bonghwa county including Bongseong-myeon

Bonghwa County
Towns and townships in North Gyeongsang Province